Cave Mountain is a mountain located in Greene County, New York south of Windham, New York. Cave Mountain drains south into East Kill and north into Batavia Kill. Cave Mountain is part of the Shawangunk Ridge (also known as The Gunks), which is a long mountain range that runs through eastern New York.

References

Mountains of Greene County, New York
Mountains of New York (state)